= Vahram Atanesyan =

Politician

- Occupations: journalist, legislator

Vahram Atanesyan is a journalist and legislator from Nagorno-Karabakh. He is the chair of the legislature's standing committee on Foreign Affairs.
